Congo – A Political Tragedy is a 2018 independent documentary story of the Democratic Republic of Congo's political history, written by Patrick Kabeya and Mina Malu. It chronicles the Congo Free State, The Belgian Congo as well as the key figures that played a role in its history such as Belgian King Leopold II, Patrice Lumumba, Joseph Kasa-Vubu, Joseph Mobutu, Moise Tshombe and Laurent Desire Kabila.

Reception
The film was first screened at the 2018 Festival international du film panafricain de Cannes.

Awards 
Audiences Choice Awards - Trinidad, Caribbean 2019

References

External links
 
 

2018 films
Canadian documentary films
Documentary films about African politics
Films set in the Democratic Republic of the Congo
Works about the Democratic Republic of the Congo
Documentary films about the Democratic Republic of the Congo
Cultural depictions of Patrice Lumumba
2018 documentary films
French-language Canadian films
2010s Canadian films